Ramenki District is a district in Western Administrative Okrug of the federal city of Moscow, Russia. Population: 126,000 (2017 est.)

History
The modern district was formed in 1997 by the merger of Remenki District and Mosfilmovsky District.  Russia's largest university, Moscow State University, is situated here, as are the All-Russian Academy of Foreign Trade and the film studio Mosfilm.  It is also rumored to be the location of a large nuclear bunker.

References

External links
 Ramenki.info
 Ramenki.net

Districts of Moscow